Cedric Nolf (born 18 June 1989 in Kortrijk) is a Belgian athlete specialising in the long jump. Earlier in his career he competed in the decathlon.

His personal bests in the long jump are 7.89 metres outdoors (2014) and 7.91 metres indoors (2015).

Competition record

Personal bests
Outdoor
100 metres – 10.93 (+0.8 m/s) (Helsinki 2012)
400 metres – 49.74 (Helsinki 2012)
1500 metres – 4:51.14 (Herentals 2011)
110 metres hurdles – 14.69 (+0.4 m/s) (Götzis 2012)
High jump – 1.95 (Shenzhen 2011)
Pole vault – 4.90 (Ostrava 2011)
Long jump – 7.89 (+1.2 m/s) (Kortrijk 2014)
Shot put – 14.21 (Desenzano del Garda 2012)
Discus throw – 41.60 (Ostrava 2011)
Javelin throw – 66.94 (Desenzano del Garda 2011)
Decathlon – 7818 (Shenzhen 2011)

Indoor
60 metres – 7.03 (Ghent 2014)
1000 metres – 2:53.85 (Ghent 2012)
60 metres hurdles – 8.17 (Ghent 2012)
High jump – 1.87 (Ghent 2012)
Pole vault – 4.80 (Ghent 2012)
Long jump – 7.91 (Ghent 2015)
Shot put – 14.20 (Ghent 2013)
Heptathlon – 5669 (Ghent 2012)

References

1989 births
Living people
Belgian male long jumpers
Belgian decathletes
Sportspeople from Kortrijk
Competitors at the 2015 Summer Universiade
Competitors at the 2011 Summer Universiade